Kwoiek Peak is a  mountain summit located in British Columbia, Canada.

Description
It is part of the Lillooet Ranges of the Coast Mountains and the nearest higher neighbor is Kumkan Peak,  to the southeast. Meltwater from the Kwoiek Glacier on the northeast slope drains into Stukolait Lake → Kwoiek Creek → Fraser River; the Rutledge Glacier on the west slope drains to Rutledge Creek → Stein River → Fraser River; and precipitation runoff from the peak's south slope drains to Mehatl Creek → Nahatlatch River → Fraser River.

Etymology
The mountain is named in association with Kwoiek Creek, Kwoiek Lake, and Kwoiek Needle. Kwoiek is a Thompson Indian word meaning "gouged out," referring to a large chunk missing from the canyon wall. The toponym was officially adopted on March 31, 1917, by the Geographical Names Board of Canada.

Climate
Based on the Köppen climate classification, Kwoiek Peak is located in a subarctic climate zone of western North America. Most weather fronts originate in the Pacific Ocean, and travel east toward the Coast Mountains where they are forced upward by the range (Orographic lift), causing them to drop their moisture in the form of rain or snowfall. As a result, the Coast Mountains experience high precipitation, especially during the winter months in the form of snowfall. Winter temperatures can drop below −20 °C with wind chill factors below −30 °C. This climate supports the Kwoiek and Rutledge glaciers surrounding the peak. The months July through September offer the most favorable weather for climbing Kwoiek Peak.

See also
Kwoiek Needle
Geography of British Columbia

References

External links
 Weather: Kwoiek Peak

Two-thousanders of British Columbia
Pacific Ranges
Kamloops Division Yale Land District
Coast Mountains
Lillooet Ranges